The Matsell Bridge is a historic structure located northeast of Springville, Iowa, United States. This bridge replaced a bowstring truss bridge that had been built in stages between 1870 and 1906. E.W.
Blumenschein, bridge design engineer for the Iowa State Highway Commission, recommended a plate girder bridge as a replacement.  Clifford Shoemaker, District Engineer of the Federal Bureau of Public Roads, approved the plans as the new span was built by the Works Progress Administration. It was constructed by Amos Melberg for about $22,300.  The bridge was listed on the National Register of Historic Places in 1998.

See also
 
 
 
 
 List of bridges on the National Register of Historic Places in Iowa
 National Register of Historic Places listings in Linn County, Iowa

References

Bridges completed in 1939
Works Progress Administration in Iowa
Bridges in Linn County, Iowa
National Register of Historic Places in Linn County, Iowa
Road bridges on the National Register of Historic Places in Iowa
Plate girder bridges in the United States